"Rolex" is a single by American musical duo Ayo & Teo. The song peaked at number 20 on the US Billboard Hot 100. It was produced by BLSD and Backpack.

Music video
The audio of "Rolex" was uploaded on Ayo & Teo's YouTube account on January 13, 2017. The music video was uploaded on their VEVO account on May 26, 2017. The video has received over 980 million views as of February 2023 and features Usher. The audio has also received over 134 million views.

Charts

Weekly charts

Year-end charts

Certifications

References

2017 singles
2017 songs
Columbia Records singles
Songs written by Jazze Pha
Songs written by Polow da Don
Trap music songs
Rolex